The 2000–01 National Division Three South was the first season (fourteenth overall) of the fourth division (south) of the English domestic rugby union competition using the name National Division Three South.  New teams to the division included Reading and Blackheath who were relegated from the 1999–2000 National League 1 while promoted teams included Basingstoke and Launceston, champions of London Division 1 and South West Division 1 respectively.  The league system was 2 points for a win and 1 point for a draw.  The promotion system was changed for this season with a playoff system being introduced.  The champions of both National Division Three South and National Division Three North would automatically go up but the runners up of these two divisions would meet each other in a one off match (at the home ground of the side with the superior league record) to see who would claim the third and final promotion place to National Division Two.

Plymouth Albion finished the season as champions by winning an incredible 26 games out of 26 to gain promotion to the 2001–02 National Division Two with runners up Launceston 11 points behind.  It was an excellent season for newly promoted Launceston but they were unable to top it with promotion, losing 40 – 23 away to the 2000-01 National Division Three North runners up Sedgley Park.  It was a great season for south-west based clubs in the division with all four sides occupying the top five league places and the twelve derby matches between the sides had over 21,000 spectators attending in total.  At the other end of the table, Cheltenham, Basingstoke, Weston-super-Mare and Reading were the sides to be relegated with all sides being fairly competitive across the course of the season but not having quite enough to keep safe.  Cheltenham and Weston-super-Mare would drop to the South West Division 1 for the following season while Basingstoke would make an instant return to London Division 1.

Participating teams and locations

Final league table

Results
''Be aware that some of the early season scores from Rugby Statbunker are incorrect (possibly due to an automatic scoring system used on that website) as they are different from those reported in the Telegraph.  I have used references from the Telegraph wherever possible which should tie in with the results from the England rugby website.

Round 1

Round 2 

Postponed.  Game rescheduled to 23 September 2000.

Postponed. Game rescheduled to 23 September 2000.

Postponed.  Game rescheduled to 23 September 2000.

Round 3 

Postponed.  Game rescheduled to 4 November 2000.

Postponed.  Game rescheduled to 4 November 2000.

Postponed.  Game rescheduled to 3 February 2001.

Round 2 (rescheduled games) 

Game rescheduled from 9 September 2000.

Game rescheduled from 9 September 2000.

Game rescheduled from 9 September 2000.

Round 4

Round 5

Round 6 

Postponed.  Game rescheduled to 4 November 2000.

Postponed.  Game rescheduled to 17 February 2001.

Postponed.  Game rescheduled to 21 October 2000.

Postponed.  Game rescheduled to 17 February 2001.

Postponed.  Game rescheduled to 3 March 2001.

Round 7

Rounds 3 & 6 (rescheduled games) 

Game rescheduled from 21 October 2000.

Game rescheduled from 16 September 2000.

Game rescheduled from 16 September 2000.

Game rescheduled from 21 October 2000.

Round 8

Round 9

Round 10

Round 11

Round 12 

Postponed.  Game rescheduled to 17 February 2001.

Postponed.  Game rescheduled to 3 February 2001.

Round 13

Round 14 

Postponed.  Game rescheduled to 3 February 2001.

Round 15 

Postponed. Game rescheduled to 3 February 2001.

Postponed. Game rescheduled to 3 February 2001.

Postponed. Game rescheduled to 3 February 2001.

Postponed.  Game rescheduled to 7 April 2001.

Postponed.  Game rescheduled to 7 April 2001.

Postponed.  Game rescheduled to 3 March 2001.

Round 16

Round 17

Round 18 

Postponed.  Game rescheduled to 7 April 2001.

Postponed.  Game rescheduled to 21 April 2001.

Postponed.  Game rescheduled to 17 February 2001.

Postponed.  Game rescheduled to 17 February 2001.

Round 19

Rounds 3, 12, 14 & 15 (rescheduled games) 

Game rescheduled from 30 December 2000.

Game rescheduled from 30 December 2000.

Game rescheduled from 23 December 2000.

Game rescheduled from 30 December 2000.

Game rescheduled from 16 September 2000.

Game rescheduled from 9 December 2000.

Round 20

Rounds 6, 12 & 18 (rescheduled games) 

Game rescheduled from 9 December 2000.

Game rescheduled from 21 October 2000.

Game rescheduled from 21 October 2000.

Game rescheduled from 17 February 2001.

Game rescheduled from 20 January 2001.

Round 21

Rounds 6 & 15 (rescheduled games) 

Game rescheduled from 21 October 2000.

Game rescheduled from 30 December 2000.

Round 22 

Postponed.  Game rescheduled to 28 April 2001.

Round 23 

Postponed.  Game rescheduled to 28 April 2001.

Round 24 

Postponed.  Game rescheduled to 21 April 2001.

Postponed.  Game rescheduled to 21 April 2001.

Round 25

Rounds 15 & 18 (rescheduled games) 

Game rescheduled from 30 December 2000.

Game rescheduled from 20 January 2001.

Game rescheduled from 30 December 2000.

Round 26

Rounds 18 & 24 (rescheduled games) 

Game rescheduled from 20 January 2001.

Game rescheduled from 24 March 2001.

Game rescheduled from 24 March 2001.

Rounds 22 & 23 (rescheduled games) 

Game rescheduled from 17 March 2001.

Game rescheduled from 10 March 2001.

Promotion play-off
The league runners up of National Division Three South and North would meet in a playoff game for promotion to National Division Two.  Sedgley Park were runners-up in the north and because they had a better league record than south runners-up, Launceston, they hosted the play-off match.

Total season attendances

Individual statistics 

 Note that points scorers includes tries as well as conversions, penalties and drop goals.

Top points scorers

Top try scorers

Season records

Team
Largest home win — 68 pts 
72 - 6 Plymouth Albion at home to Basingstoke on 23 December 2000
Largest away win — 51 pts
68 - 17 Penzance & Newlyn away to Tabard on 6 January 2001
Most points scored — 72 pts 
72 - 6 Plymouth Albion at home to Basingstoke on 23 December 2000
Most tries in a match — 11
Plymouth Albion at home to Basingstoke on 23 December 2000
Most conversions in a match — 9
Penzance & Newlyn at home to North Walsham on 16 December 2000
Most penalties in a match — 6 (x7)
Launceston away to Tabard on 11 November 2000
Clifton away to Launceston on 2 December 2000
Weston-super-Mare away to Reading on 2 December 2000
North Walsham at home to Launceston on 9 December 2000
Clifton at home to Penzance & Newlyn on 9 December 2000
Reading at home to Redruth on 10 March 2001
Barking at home to Westcombe Park on 14 April 2001
Most drop goals in a match — 2 (x2)
Plymouth Albion at home to North Walsham on 28 October 2000
Redruth at home to Plymouth on 18 November 2000

Player
Most points in a match — 31 (x2)
 Nat Saumi for Penzance & Newlyn away to Tabard on 6 January 2001
 Nat Saumi for Penzance & Newlyn at home to Cheltenham on 10 February 2001
Most tries in a match — 4 (x3)
 Matt Bradshaw for Launceston at home to Cheltenham on 30 September 2000
 Richard Newton for Penzance & Newlyn away to Tabard on 6 January 2001
 Nat Saumi for Penzance & Newlyn at home to Cheltenham on 10 February 2001
Most conversions in a match — 9
 Nat Saumi for Penzance & Newlyn at home to North Walsham on 16 December 2000
Most penalties in a match — 6 (x7)
 Danny Sloman for Launceston away to Tabard on 11 November 2000
 Jon Martin for Clifton away to Launceston on 2 December 2000
 Neil Coleman for Weston-super-Mare away to Reading on 2 December 2000
 Phil Friel for North Walsham at home to Launceston on 9 December 2000
 Jon Martin for Clifton at home to Penzance & Newlyn on 9 December 2000
 Matt Senior for Reading at home to Redruth on 10 March 2001
 Billy Murphy for Barking at home to Westcombe Park on 14 April 2001
Most drop goals in a match — 2
 Tom Barlow for Plymouth Albion at home to North Walsham on 28 October 2000
 Bede Brown for Redruth at home to Plymouth on 18 November 2000

Attendances
Highest — 3,000 
Plymouth Albion at home to Launceston on 31 March 2001
Lowest — 100
Tabard at home to Reading on 25 November 2000
Highest Average Attendance — 1,281
Plymouth Albion
Lowest Average Attendance — 168
Clifton

See also
 English rugby union system
 Rugby union in England

References

External links
 NCA Rugby

2000-01
2000–01 in English rugby union leagues